Melghirimyces profundicolus  is a bacterium from the genus of Melghirimyces which has been isolated from deep-sea sediments from the Indian Ocean.

References

External links
Type strain of Melghirimyces profundicolus at BacDive -  the Bacterial Diversity Metadatabase	

Bacillales
Bacteria described in 2013